Pedro Daniel Estrada Espitia (born 4 May 1985) is a Mexican professional boxer.

Pedro is the former WBC Silver lightweight Champion, WBC Youth World lightweight Champion, WBC FECARBOX lightweight Champion, WBC Continental Americas lightweight Champion and also the WBC Caribbean Boxing Federation (CABOFE) lightweight Champion.

He has lost to famous boxers such as the current WBC Lightweight Champion Omar Figueroa and WBO lightweight contender Kevin Mitchell.

Early life
As a child Estrada would sell candy and wash car windows on the street, to help support his family.

Professional career
His first loss was to undefeated lightweight prospect José Emilio Perea. On February 27, 2010 Daniel beat veteran Angel Alirio Rivero by 10th round T.K.O. in Guadalajara, Jalisco, Mexico.

References

External links

Boxers from Mexico City
Lightweight boxers
1985 births
Living people
Mexican male boxers